Twin Oaks is a historic home at Linthicum Heights, Anne Arundel County, Maryland, United States. The house is a -story brick Greek Revival–influenced dwelling constructed in 1857, with additions and Neo-Classical embellishments made in the late 19th and early 20th centuries. The final composition is an eclectic, Georgian Revival–influenced dwelling. Twin Oaks was the home of U.S. Congressman John Charles Linthicum, who is noted for sponsoring the legislation which established The Star-Spangled Banner as the United States National Anthem. He entertained many dignitaries at Twin Oaks, including William Jennings Bryan and General Douglas MacArthur. Also on the property are a Victorian birdhouse, an aviary, a columned grape arbor, two freestanding concrete-cast columns, and a few pieces of statuary.

Twin Oaks was listed on the National Register of Historic Places in 1986.

See also
 Tulip Hill

References

External links
, including photo from 1984, at Maryland Historical Trust

Houses on the National Register of Historic Places in Maryland
Houses in Anne Arundel County, Maryland
Colonial Revival architecture in Maryland
Neoclassical architecture in Maryland
Georgian Revival architecture in Maryland
Houses completed in 1857
Linthicum, Maryland
National Register of Historic Places in Anne Arundel County, Maryland
1857 establishments in Maryland